The British Psychoanalytic Council (BPC) is an association of training institutions and professional associations which have their roots in established psychoanalysis and analytical psychology. They bring together approximately 1500 practitioners of psychoanalytic and psychodynamic psychotherapy (including psychoanalysts, Jungian analysts and child psychotherapists) who as individuals become registrants of the BPC.

The BPC (then the British Confederation of Psychotherapists) was formed on 8 March 1992, emerging from the United Kingdom Standing Conference for Psychotherapy (now the UKCP) as a specifically psychoanalytically-oriented organisation.

Annual register 

It has an annual register of those practitioners who meet its continuing professional and fitness-to-practise standards. Promoting professional standards and acting as a voluntary regulator of the profession is a key role of the BPC.

The BPC accredits the trainings of its member institutions, ensuring that they meet published training standards. Some of these are member organisations of the International Psychoanalytical Association.

Practise requirements
An individual who qualifies from one of these trainings is then eligible for entry into the BPC's register. BPC registration then continues to be governed by a range of fitness to practise requirements:

 The therapist must be a member of good standing of their own professional institution (which is a member institution of the BPC)
 They subscribe to and are governed by the BPC's published Code of Ethics
 They are regulated by the BPC's Complaints Procedure
 They must maintain an annual programme of continuing professional development (CPD), monitored and approved by the BPC, which includes consultation on their clinical work, attending lectures and courses and a broad range of professional activity.

Training and qualifications 

The preparation and training for becoming a psychoanalytic psychotherapist involves undergoing analysis.

Safeguarding the public 

The individual organisations that train psychotherapists have always been self-regulating. Over the last twenty years, however, there has been an increase in the number of institutions and range of psychotherapies on offer to the public. The British Psychoanalytic Council is one of a number of bodies which exist to protect the interests of the public by promoting standards in the selection, training, professional association and ethical conduct of psychotherapists. It is the primary body for psychoanalytic psychotherapy in the UK.

The BPC, together with each of its member institutions, aims to protect the public by setting out the appropriate standards of professional conduct, and a Code of Ethics, which describes the responsibilities of psychoanalytic psychotherapists. There are also comprehensive complaints and disciplinary procedures, which include the sanction of striking a practitioner off both their organisation's membership list and the BPC's Register. The detailed fitness to practise policies are all published on its website or are available from the BPC office.

See also 
 United Kingdom Council for Psychotherapy
 British Association for Counselling and Psychotherapy

General:
 Mental health in the United Kingdom

List of BPC Member Institutions 
 Association for Psychodynamic Practice and Counselling in Organisational Settings
 Association of Jungian Analysts
 Association of Medical Psychodynamic Psychotherapists
 Association of Psychodynamic Counsellors
 Birkbeck Counselling Association
 British Psychoanalytical Society and the Institute of Psychoanalysis Wiki:British Psychoanalytical Society
 British Psychotherapy Foundation Wiki:British Psychotherapy Foundation
 Forensic Psychotherapy Society
 Foundation for Psychotherapy and Counselling
 North of England Association of Psychoanalytic Psychotherapists
 Northern Ireland Association for the Study of Psychoanalysis
 Scottish Association of Psychoanalytical Psychotherapists and Human Development Scotland
 Severnside Institute for Psychotherapy
 Society of Analytical Psychology Wiki: Society of Analytical Psychology
 Tavistock Relationships
 Tavistock Society of Psychotherapists
 Foundation for Psychotherapy and Counselling
 Wessex Counselling
 West Midlands Institute of Psychotherapy

Registrants of the BPC include: Mike Brearley, Peter Fonagy, Brett Kahr, Carol Leader, Susie Orbach, Andrew Samuels, Mark Solms, Estela V. Welldon

References

External links 
 The British Psychoanalytic Council
 European Federation for Psychoanalytic Psychotherapy in the Public Sector
 International Psychoanalytical Association

Health in the London Borough of Islington
Psychotherapy in the United Kingdom
Organisations based in the London Borough of Islington
Psychoanalysis organizations
Professional associations based in the United Kingdom
1992 establishments in the United Kingdom
Organizations established in 1992